Macalla nubilalis is a moth in the family Pyralidae.

References

Pyralidae